A number of units of measurement were used in Mauritius. The metric system was adopted in 1876, and has been compulsory in Mauritius since 1878.

System before metric system

Systems including old French and British were used.

Capacity

In addition to old French and British units, the following were used:

1 cash = 227.11 litre

1 velt =  cash.

References

Mauritian culture
Mauritius